Events in the year 2008 in Kerala.

Incumbents 

Governor of Kerala -

 R.L. Bhatia (till July),
 R. S. Gavai (from July)

Chief minister of Kerala -

 V. S. Achuthanandan

Events 

 January 30 - Kerala cabinet directs Chief secretary to submit an enquiry report on controversial 70 acre HMT Land Deal that had taken place in October 2006 between HMT and Mumbai based HDIL. There are allegations that the land which costs 700 crore was sold at a highly discounted price of 91 crores to HDIL's subsidiary Blue Star Realtors.
 February 6 - Forceful eviction of poor families from Moolampilly for Vembanad Rail Bridge to International Container Transshipment Terminal, Kochi.
 February 26 -  In an affidavit placed before Kerala High Court, Government of Kerala submits that HMT land deal is legal.
 February 28 - British Council Library, Thiruvananthapuram closes down.
 July 17 - Government of Kerala revises the Social science textbook for 7th standard students in the state following controversy over a chapter named "Mathamillatha Jeevan" which was accused of promoting Atheism.
 December 17 - Kerala State Road Transport Corporation introduces Volvo Buses in Thiruvananthapuram - Bangalore route.

Deaths 

 January 29 - Baby John, 90, politician and Revolutionary Socialist Party leader.

See also 

 History of Kerala
 2008 in India

References 

2000s in Kerala